Inform is a programming language for interactive fiction.

Inform may also refer to:

INFORM, Inc., an environmental organization
INFORM (Information Network Focus on Religious Movements), UK
INFORM, predecessor of CorVision
What an informant or informer does